Ronan Byrne (born 17 April 1998) is an Irish national representative rower. He is an Olympian, was a silver medallist at the 2019 World Rowing Championships in the men's double scull and won a gold medal at the 2019 European Rowing U23 Championships in Ioannina. He raced the men's double scull with Philip Doyle at Tokyo Olympian. They finished fourth in the petite final for an overall tenth place at the Olympic regatta.

References

External links
 
 
 

1998 births
Living people
Irish male rowers
World Rowing Championships medalists for Ireland
European Rowing Championships medalists
Olympic rowers of Ireland
Rowers at the 2020 Summer Olympics
21st-century Irish people